This is a list of the United States Billboard Dance Club Songs number-one hits of 2017.

References

United States Dance
2017
number-one dance singles